William Arthur Parkin (born 15 February 1952 in Whangārei) is a former field hockey player from New Zealand, who was a member of the national team that won the gold medal at the 1976 Summer Olympics in Montreal.

In February 2018, Parkin was found guilty on two charges of indecently assaulting an eleven-year-old girl. He was acquitted of three other charges involving two other complainants. He was sentenced to one year and eight months imprisonment.

References

External links
 

20th-century criminals
21st-century criminals
New Zealand male field hockey players
New Zealand field hockey coaches
Olympic field hockey players of New Zealand
Olympic gold medalists for New Zealand
Field hockey players at the 1972 Summer Olympics
Field hockey players at the 1976 Summer Olympics
Field hockey players at the 1984 Summer Olympics
1952 births
Living people
New Zealand prisoners and detainees
New Zealand people convicted of child sexual abuse
People convicted of indecent assault
Prisoners and detainees of New Zealand
Sportspeople convicted of crimes
Field hockey players from Whangārei
Olympic medalists in field hockey
Medalists at the 1976 Summer Olympics